Hamish Keith More (30 May 1940 – 2 January 2022) was a Scottish cricketer who represented Scotland in first-class cricket from 1966 to 1976 and in List A cricket in 1980.

A right-handed batsman, More made his highest first-class score against Surrey in 1969, when he opened the second innings and scored 89 out of a team total of 166. Against the touring Pakistan national team in 1971 he set a Scottish catching record that still stands when he took seven catches in the match, six of them off the spin bowling of Jimmy Allan.

More toured Bangladesh with MCC in 1978–79. In all, he played more than 350 games for MCC. After retiring from league cricket at the age of 53 he played midweek and Sunday matches for various teams till his seventies.

He died in Edinburgh on 2 January 2022, at the age of 81.

References

External links

 H. K. More at CricketEurope

1940 births
2022 deaths
Cricketers from Edinburgh
People educated at George Heriot's School
Scottish cricketers
T. N. Pearce's XI cricketers